Quadriga was an annual German award sponsored by Netzwerk Quadriga GmbH, a non-profit organization based in Berlin. The award recognized four people or groups for their commitment to innovation, renewal, and a pioneering spirit through political, economic, and cultural activities.

The award consisted of a small statue resembling the quadriga atop the Brandenburg Gate in Berlin. Werkstatt Deutschland presented the award annually on German Unity Day, which commemorates German reunification in 1990. The award was presented by prominent individuals, including Viktor Yushchenko, Bernard Kouchner, and Mikhail Gorbachev.

History
The award was first given in 2003. For the first two years, the award ceremony took place at Konzerthaus Berlin. From 2005 until 2008, the ceremony was held at Komische Oper Berlin opera house. In 2009, the award ceremony was hosted at the seat of the Foreign Office of Germany.

The announcement that Vladimir Putin would receive the award in 2011 was widely condemned. As a result of protests by Quadriga board members and former recipients, the 2011 awards and ceremonies were cancelled. Likewise, the Quadriga was not awarded in 2012.

Recipients

2003

 Armin Mueller-Stahl, German actor
 Norman Foster, British architect
 Jean-Claude Juncker, Prime Minister of Luxembourg
Einars Repše, Prime Minister of Latvia
 Amal Rifai, Odelia Ainbinder, and Sylke Tempel, authors of Wir wollen beide hier leben: Eine schwierige Freundschaft in Jerusalem

2004

 Recep Tayyip Erdoğan, Prime Minister of Turkey
 Éric-Emmanuel Schmitt, French author
 Thomas Quasthoff, German singer
 Šimon Pánek, Czech humanitarian
 Hamid Karzai, President of Afghanistan

2005

 Helmut Kohl, former German Chancellor
 Timothy Berners-Lee, British scientist, inventor of the World Wide Web
 Catherine McCartney, Claire McCartney, Donna McCartney, Gemma McMahon, Paula Arnold and Bridgeen Hagans, family of Robert McCartney, a victim of IRA terrorism
 Karīm al-Hussaynī, Āgā Khān IV, head of the Ismaili

2006

 Shimon Peres, Vice Prime Minister of Israel
 Riccardo Illy, Italian politician
 Florian Henckel von Donnersmarck, Ulrich Mühe, and Sebastian Koch, German artists in recognition of their work The Lives of Others
 Viktor Yushchenko, President of Ukraine

2007

 Gerhard Schröder, former German Chancellor
 Aicha El-Wafi and Phyllis Rodriguez, mothers of a perpetrator and a victim of the September 11, 2001 attacks seeking reconciliation
 Der Spiegel, represented by editor-in-chief Stefan Aust
 Queen Silvia of Sweden

2008
 Boris Tadić, president of Serbia
 Eckart Höfling, Franciscan and director of Venerável Ordem Terceira de São Francisco de Peniténcia in Rio de Janeiro
 Wikipedia, represented by Jimmy Wales
 Peter Gabriel, musician and human rights activist

2009
 José Manuel Barroso, president of the European Commission
 Marius Müller-Westernhagen, musician
 Campaign Change for Equality, activists from Iran
 Václav Havel, author and former president of the Czech Republic
 Bärbel Bohley, initiator of the New Forum and artist
 Mikhail Gorbachev, Nobel Peace Prize Laureate and former president of the Soviet Union

2010
 George Papandreou : Power of Veracity 
 Die Bundeswehr, represented by Karl-Theodor zu Guttenberg and Lieutenant General Günter Weiler : Service of Responsibility 
 Dr. Wolfgang Schäuble and Lothar de Maizière : Architecture of Unification
 Dr. Albrecht and Kristina Hennig : Light of Empathy 
 Olafur Eliasson : Art of Interaction

2011
 Cancelled

The announcement that Prime Minister of Russia Vladimir Putin would be awarded the prize led to a public outcry. Quadriga board members Cem Özdemir of the German Green Party, Jimmy Wales of Wikipedia, and Heidelberg University history professor Edgar Wolfrum stepped down in protest. Former recipients Olafur Eliasson and Václav Havel decided to return their awards.  The New York Times commented that from the volume of outcry the ranks of people feeling Putin, a former East Germany-assigned KGB agent and later chief, had rolled back democracy and human rights in Russia are apparently quite large. The organisers decided not to make any awards in 2011 as a result of the controversy. They released a statement on 16 July 2011 saying they acted "in light of the growing and unbearable pressure and the danger of further escalation" and that they deeply regretted hearing news of Havel's decision. The awards ceremony scheduled for that October was therefore cancelled.

References

External links 

   (archived version)

German awards
Awards established in 2003
2003 establishments in Germany